Landulf of Yariglia (Italian: Beato Landolfo da Vareglate) was Benedictine Bishop of Asti, Italy.

He was born in the latter part of the eleventh century at ‘Vareglate’, which has been identified with the village of Vergiate to the north of Milan, and also with Variglié, a locality near Asti. He studied at the Benedictine monastery of San Pietro in Ciel d'Oro in Pavia, but did not become a monk.

Notes

Italian Roman Catholic saints
12th-century Christian saints
1134 deaths
Italian Benedictines
12th-century Italian Roman Catholic bishops
Bishops of Asti
Year of birth unknown